David Dunn (born June 1, 1936) is an American bobsledder. He competed in the four-man event at the 1968 Winter Olympics.

References

1936 births
Living people
American male bobsledders
Olympic bobsledders of the United States
Bobsledders at the 1968 Winter Olympics
Sportspeople from Milwaukee